Sir Thomas Wroth, 3rd Baronet (c.1674-1721) of Petherton Park, Somerset was an English High Sheriff and Member of Parliament.

He was born the only surviving son of Sir John Wroth, 2nd Baronet, of Petherton Park. He succeeded his father in 1677 as a very young child, inheriting his Petherton Park estate. He was educated at Winchester School.

He was MP in succession for Bridgwater from 1701 to 1708, for Somerset from 1710 to 1713 and for Wells for 1713 to 1715. He was pricked High Sheriff of Somerset for 1708–09.

He died in 1721. He had married in 1693 Mary, the daughter of Thomas Osbaldeston of Aldersbrook, Essex and had 2 daughters. The baronetcy thus became extinct. His estate was inherited by his eldest daughter Cicely and her husband Sir Hugh Acland, 6th Baronet. His younger daughter Elizabeth married lawyer and MP Thomas Palmer, FRS.

References

|-

|-

|-

|-

1670s births
1721 deaths
Baronets in the Baronetage of England
People educated at Westminster School, London
High Sheriffs of Somerset
English MPs 1701–1702
English MPs 1702–1705
English MPs 1705–1707
Members of the Parliament of Great Britain for English constituencies
British MPs 1707–1708
British MPs 1710–1713
British MPs 1713–1715